Alfred Joseph Stourton, 20th Baron Stourton, 24th Baron Segrave, 23rd Baron Mowbray (28 February 1829 – 18 April 1893) was the son of the nineteenth Baron Stourton and Mary Lucy Clifford, daughter of the 6th Baron Clifford of Chudleigh and his wife Eleanor Mary Arundell.

By virtue of being descended from a co-heiress of the baronies of Mowbray and Segrave, Alfred had these baronies called out of abeyance in 1878.

He married Mary Margaret Corbally in 1865. She was the only child of the  Irish politician Matthew Corbally MP of Corbalton Hall, County  Meath and the Hon. Matilda Margaret Preston, daughter of the 12th Viscount Gormanston. They had ten children:
Hon. Charles Stourton (1867–1936); inherited his father's titles in 1893.
Hon. Mary Lucy Agnes Stourton (1868–1950); married to Cecil Henry Maxwell-Lyte
Hon. Edith Matilda Mary Stourton (1870–1924); unmarried
Hon. Hilda Mary Stourton (1871–1958); unmarried
Major Hon. Alfred Edward Corbally Joseph Stourton (1872–1926); Second Boer War veteran
Hon. Alison Mary Stourton (1874–1957); unmarried
Hon. Ethel Mary Josephine Stourton (1876–1948); unmarried
Hon. Nigel Roger Plantagenet Joseph Stourton (1879–1908); married Florence Piggott, no issue
Hon. Edward Plantagenet Joseph Corbally Stourton (1880–1966); married Beatrice Page, 2 children
Hon. Matilda Margaret Mary Josephine Stourton (1884–1975); married Lt.-Col. Herbert Alexander Graf (Count) von Metzsch-Reichenbach of the Kingdom of Saxony

|-

|-

Notes

References
 Kidd, Charles and Williamson, David (editors). Debrett's Peerage and Baronetage (1995 edition). London: St. Martin's Press, 1995, 

1829 births
1893 deaths
Barons Mowbray
24
20
19th-century English people